The Randlett House is located in Lancaster, Texas, United States. It was added to the National Register of Historic Places on August 11, 1978.

Constructed by S.D. Andrews for Sam Randlett, a prominent local merchant, the house was completed in 1896 and represented the Randlett's social status within the community. Displaying characteristics of Victorian architecture, the Randlett house possesses an asymmetrical floor plan, numerous projecting wings, a complicated roof line and detailed woodwork.

See also

National Register of Historic Places listings in Dallas County, Texas

References

Houses on the National Register of Historic Places in Texas
Queen Anne architecture in Texas
Houses in Dallas County, Texas
National Register of Historic Places in Dallas County, Texas
Houses completed in 1896